Scotsburn (Scottish Gaelic: Allt nan Albannach) is a Canadian rural community located in Pictou County, Nova Scotia.

The community is the namesake as well as the headquarters of Scotsburn Co-operative Services Limited, the largest independent dairy company in Atlantic Canada, as well as Scotsburn Lumber Limited, one of the largest sawmills in Nova Scotia, with an apx population of 5,500 as of 2018.

References
Scotsburn on Destination Nova Scotia

Communities in Pictou County
General Service Areas in Nova Scotia